Emmanuel Dogbe (born 6 June 1992) is a Ghanaian professional footballer who plays as a midfielder.

Career
Dogbe has played in Ghana and Sweden for Feyenoord Ghana, Medeama, Åtvidaberg, AFC United and Oskarshamn.

References

1992 births
Living people
Ghanaian footballers
West African Football Academy players
Medeama SC players
Åtvidabergs FF players
AFC Eskilstuna players
Oskarshamns AIK players
Ghana Premier League players
Allsvenskan players
Ettan Fotboll players
Association football midfielders
Ghanaian expatriate footballers
Ghanaian expatriate sportspeople in Sweden
Expatriate footballers in Sweden